The Flight into Egypt is a 1627 oil painting on panel by Rembrandt, now in the Musée des Beaux-Arts de Tours, which depicts the Flight into Egypt by Joseph, Mary, and Jesus.

References
Museum page (in French)

1627 paintings
Paintings by Rembrandt
Rembrandt
Donkeys in art